Colosseum Theater is a performance venue in Essen, Germany.

External links

Theatres in Essen
Buildings and structures in Essen